Corraine Wilson (born 11 April 1965) is an Alba Party politician who was previously the Scottish National Party (SNP) Member of Parliament (MP) for Ayr, Carrick and Cumnock from 2015 to 2017.

Early life
Wilson worked in the Civil Service for 20 years after leaving school. She went on to study Psychology at the University of the West of Scotland and set up her own business and events company called "Caledonii Resources" in April 2012 just before being elected to serve as a Councillor in Ayr East in the 2012 South Ayrshire Council election.

Political career
Wilson became a South Ayrshire Councillor in the 2012 local elections for the ward of Ayr East. She was elected to the British Parliament in the 2015 general election.

From June 2015 until August 2016, she was one of 125 MPs who employed a member of their family: employing her son Kieran as a caseworker/personal assistant. From 15 September 2016, she had employed her daughter Shannon as a caseworker/personal assistant, which was allowed under IPSA rules up until the election in June 2017.

From the period of 1 June 2015 to 31 May 2016, the statement, Wilson claimed a total of £94,545.41 in public expenses, which was the 7th highest amount of any MP in the United Kingdom that year.

In 2016, Wilson was appointed as disabilities spokesperson for the SNP. During Wilson's time on the Welfare Reform and Work Bill she argued against the benefit cap, benefit sanctions and the removal of poverty targets. Wilson campaigned in favour of the United Kingdom remaining a member of the European Union at the 2016 United Kingdom European Union membership referendum, then later voted against the European Union (Notification of Withdrawal) Bill 2017.

During her time in office, Wilson never voted against her party and attended 277 of 467 votes (59.3%) – well below average amongst MPs.

She stood for re-election at the 2017 UK general election, but lost to Conservative Bill Grant on a 17.5% swing, with Grant overturning Wilson's 15,137 vote lead over the Conservatives to gain the constituency with a 2,774 vote majority.

On 27 March 2021, Wilson announced that she had left the SNP to stand as an Alba Party list candidate in the 2021 Scottish Parliament election.

Controversies
In 2016, Wilson and Chic Brodie, an SNP MSP representing the South Scotland electoral region at the Scottish Parliament, faced controversy over a public expenses scandal, with Chic Brodie transferring £87,616 of public expenses into Corri Wilson's Caledonii Resources for "outsourced constituency work" after her election as councillor to the Ayr East ward in 2012, with some £20,000 being transferred during the Scottish independence referendum campaign in 2014 and a further £20,000 being transferred during the 2015 UK general election campaign, well in excess of Independent Parliamentary Standards Authority guidelines. The expenses were not recorded within Corri Wilson's Register of Members' Interests. Caledonii Resources was later dissolved in May 2017.

References

External links 
 profile on SNP website
 

1965 births
21st-century Scottish women politicians
21st-century Scottish politicians
Alba Party politicians
Female members of the Parliament of the United Kingdom for Scottish constituencies
Living people
Members of the Parliament of the United Kingdom for Scottish constituencies
People from South Ayrshire
Scottish National Party councillors
Scottish National Party MPs
UK MPs 2015–2017
People from Ayr